Oliveto (or Uliveto) may refer to :

Oliveto, Italian for olive grove
Count of Oliveto, a fiefdom of the Kingdom of Naples, in southern Italy
Oliveto (surname), surname

Places in Italy
Oliveto Citra, in the Province of Salerno
Oliveto Lario, in the Province of Lecco
Oliveto Lucano, in the Province of Matera
Uliveto Terme, part of the municipality of Vicopisano, in the Province of Pisa
Monte Oliveto Maggiore, a monastery in Tuscany, the mother house of the Olivetans
San Pietro in Oliveto, a Roman Catholic church in central Brescia

See also